Voltri XV is an abstract sculpture by David Smith.

It is part of the Voltri series created in May through June 1962 in Italy. 
He worked at an abandoned steel factory, where he welded scrap steel. With assistants, he produced Twenty Six sculptures in thirty days.

It showed at Spoleto, Italy, the White House, and the Guggenheim Museum, and is at the Hirshhorn Museum and Sculpture Garden.

See also
 List of public art in Washington, D.C., Ward 2

References

External links
"The Hirshhorn Sculpture Gardens", Bluffton
Voltri XV
Waymarking

1962 sculptures
Hirshhorn Museum and Sculpture Garden
Outdoor sculptures in Washington, D.C.
Sculptures by David Smith
Sculptures of the Smithsonian Institution
Steel sculptures in Washington, D.C.